The National Football Jia A League (simplified Chinese, commonly known as Jia-A, was the highest tier of professional football in the People's Republic of China, during 1994 through 2003, operating under the auspices of the Chinese Football Association.

The Chinese Professional Football League was established in 1994. Under the direct supervision of the CFA's Professional League Committee, this nationwide league was divided into Divisions 1 and 2.  Division 1 was subdivided into Divisions 1A and 1B, Jia A and Jia B, Jia being the Chinese word for top or first. Division 2 was and still is subdivided into regional divisions.

History

Pre history
Pre 1980, China National League clubs was owned by their respective local physical culture and sports committees, sports institutes, and army sports units. Factory-owned clubs were not allowed to participate in national leagues. Dalian Dockyard, founded in 1946, was a factory-owned club, and as such could only participate in regional tournaments and national workers championship matches. In 1980,the Chinese Football Association (CFA) started to allow factory clubs to play in national leagues. Dalian Dockyard entered the National League in 1981, and in 1983, became Dalian FC, the current Dalian Shide.

In the mid-1980s, the CFA encourage factories and companies to sponsor government-owned clubs. In 1984, Guangdong, Beijing, Guangzhou and Tianjin teams were sponsored by big companies for the first time. CCTV started to show domestic league matches to the whole country. According to some articles, the match between Beijing Snowflakes and Guangdong Wanbao was a turning point for football fan participation. In 1988, Liaoning became China's first professional club, soon becoming one of Asia's best club. Liaoning was the 1990 ACC Champions, 1991 runner-up, and 1987 third place team.

The foundation 
In 1986, CFA tried to find a way to found a semi-pro league, that season National League division 1 signed its first sponsor contract, Goldlion became first main sponsor of China football league.gradually more and more fans bought tickets to watch football leagues.

In 1987 the National League Division 1 was divided into two levels- Jia-A (8 teams) and Jia-B (12 teams), CFA never admit there was a semi-pro league before 1993, because of the restrict by some laws, the enterprises could only cooperate with the government in club managements. so actually we could consider it as an enterprise league though not so accurate to describe the league.

the 8 Jia-A teams in 1987 are:

Liaoning Dongyao - Now Liaoning FC, became professional team in 1988

Tianjing Seagull - Now Tianjin Teda, became pro club in 1995

Shanghai Shenzhou - Name changed to Shanghai Shenhua in 1991 and became pro club in 1993, now Shanghai Shenhua United FC

Shandong - Now Shandong Luneng Taishan, became pro-club in 1993

August first - the Army team

Beijing Snowflakes - Name Changed to Beijing Guoan in 1992 and became pro-clubs

Guangzhou Baiyunshan - Now Guangzhou Yiyao, became professional club in 1992

Hubei Energy - Now Wuhan Guanggu, became professional club in 1994

Professionalism
In the early 1990s, CFA allows enterprises to purchase football clubs and manage them, whether they are state-owned enterprises or private-owned companies, Dalian Hualu - the former Dalian Dockyard, was bought by a private-owned company, Name changed to Dalian Wanda and became a professional club in 1993.

In 1992, CFA made an important decision - The China professional league will start in 1994, they order all the Jia-A clubs set up professional system before 1994, and for Jia-B clubs, they must realize professional structural reform before 1995. after that CFA hold a semi-pro football championship in 1993, and finally, in 1994, first ever professional leagues in China football history started. and in 1995, Jia-B announced to be a pro-league, which is still the second level. Jia-A and Jia-B, was named as C-league to represent the professional stage.

From Jia-A to CSL
Compared to Jia A, the Chinese Super League is a lot more demanding on teams. The CFA and CSL committee has imposed a range of minimum criteria to ensure professional management and administration, financial probity and a progressive youth development programme at every club. besides the regular professional league, CSL also has reserve league, U-19 League, U-17 League and U-15 League, also some cups for the young boys.

the second division, Jia B, with the new name China League, also has a new system.

The CSL and China League's goals are to promote high quality and high level competition; introduce advanced managerial concepts to the market; enforce the delivery of minimum standards of professionalism; encourage the influx of more higher quality foreign coaches and players; and gradually establish the European system for player registrations and transfers.

Jia-A League champions

Semi-pro seasons (1987-1993)

Professional seasons (1994-2003) 

 Shanghai Shenhua were stripped of the title on 19 February 2013 for the match-fixing scandal in this season.

Most successful clubs (1994-2003)

Former clubs (1994-2003)

Attendances

Season averages

Attendance by clubs

This table lists average attendances of Jia-A League clubs during 1994-2003 yearly, but only for seasons when that club played in the top division. Club names are as of 2003 season.

Awards 

The official Chinese Jia-A League annual awards are given to players, managers and referees based on their performance during the season.

Most valuable player

Golden Boot award

Manager of the year

Youth player of the year

Sponsors

References

 
Football leagues in China
Defunct top level football leagues in Asia
Sports leagues established in 1987
2003 disestablishments in China
1987 establishments in China